Ward Chipman Hazen Grimmer (October 31, 1858 – October 3, 1945) was a lawyer and political figure in New Brunswick, Canada. He represented Charlotte County in the Legislative Assembly of New Brunswick from 1903 to 1917.

Biography 
He was born in St. Stephen, New Brunswick, the son of George S. Grimmer and his wife Mary A. Hazen, and was educated at the University of New Brunswick. In 1884, he married Bessie E. Gove.

Grimmer ran unsuccessfully for a seat in the provincial assembly in 1899 but was elected in 1903, serving until 1917. He was appointed to the province's Executive Council, serving as Surveyor General from 1908 to 1911 and as Attorney General from 1911 to 1914. Grimmer also served as mayor for St. Stephen and warden for Charlotte County.

He died in Saint John on October 3, 1945.

Notes

References 
 Canadian Parliamentary Guide, 1910, EJ Chambers
 List of ministers and deputy ministers by department, New Brunswick Legislative Library  (pdf)
 New Brunswick Archives - Vital Statistics from Government Records

1858 births
1945 deaths
Lawyers in New Brunswick
Mayors of places in New Brunswick
Members of the Executive Council of New Brunswick
People from St. Stephen, New Brunswick
Progressive Conservative Party of New Brunswick MLAs
University of New Brunswick alumni